Llipllina (Quechua lliplliy to sparkle, glimmer, -na a suffix)   is a mountain in the Huancavelica Region in Peru, about  high. It is located in the Huancavelica Province, Huachocolpa District, and in the Huaytará Province, Pilpichaca District. Llipllina lies south of Yana Chuku.

References 

Mountains of Peru
Mountains of Huancavelica Region